Concepts in Blue is an album by jazz trombonist J. J. Johnson recorded in 1980 for the Pablo Today label and originally released as a CD in 2002.

Reception

The Allmusic review by Scott Yanow stated "This is a fun set of straightahead jazz. The colorful frontline obviously enjoyed playing the blues-oriented repertoire and the solos are consistently rewarding. Nothing all that innovative occurs but the results are pleasing".

Track listing
All compositions by J. J. Johnson except where noted.
 "Blue Nun" - 5:03
 "Nermus" - 6:10
 "Village Blues" (John Coltrane) - 5:07
 "Azure" - 6:00
 "Coming Home" (Kevin Johnson) - 7:10
 "Concepts in Blue" - 7:56
 "Mohawk" - 6:01

Personnel 
J. J. Johnson - trombone
Clark Terry - trumpet, flugelhorn
Ernie Watts - tenor saxophone, alto saxophone
Victor Feldman - vibraphone, keyboards (tracks 1 & 5) 
Billy Childs (track 6), Pete Jolly (tracks 2-4 & 7) - keyboards 
Ray Brown (tracks 3, 6 & 7), Tony Dumas (tracks 1, 2, 4 & 5) - bass
Kevin Johnson - drums

References 

1981 albums
Pablo Records albums
J. J. Johnson albums